The 1999 South American Championships in Athletics were held  at the Coliseo El Salitre in Bogotá, Colombia from June 25–27.

Medal summary

Men's events

Women's events

A = affected by altitude

Medal table

Participation

 (1) – guest
 (26)
 (4)
 (65)
 (25)
 (59)
 (23)
 (4)
 (1)
 (17)
 (12)
 (23)

See also
1999 in athletics (track and field)

References

External links
 Men Results – GBR Athletics
 Women Results – GBR Athletics
 Full results (archived)

South American
South American Championships in Athletics
South American
1999 in South American sport
International athletics competitions hosted by Colombia